This list of airports in India includes existing and former commercial and private airports, flying schools, certain defence airstrips, etc. As per AAI data from November 2016, the following are being targeted for scheduled commercial flight operations under UDAN-RCS, including:

 486 total airports, airstrips, flying schools, and military bases available in the country
 123 airports with scheduled commercial flights including some with dual civilian and army use
 35 international airports
Currently the number of different types of operational airports are as below:
 30 international airports
 10 customs airports
 107 domestic airport including heliports and aerodromess

Classification 

This list contains the following information:
Area served – Town or city where the airport is located. This may not always be an exact location as some airports are situated in the periphery of the town/citiy they serve.
ICAO – The four letter airport code assigned by the International Civil Aviation Organization. ICAO codes for India start with VA [West Zone - Mumbai Center], VE [East Zone - Kolkata Center], VI [North Zone - Delhi Center] and VO [South Zone - Chennai Center]
IATA – The three letter airport code assigned by the International Air Transport Association
Airport Type – Type of the airport, including the terminology used by Airports Authority of India, as per the first table below
Airport Functional Status – Functional status of the airport as per the second table below

Airports by state

Andhra Pradesh

Arunachal Pradesh

Assam

Bihar

  The airport usually serves domestic flights only, but the city being a pilgrimage city, the airport operates seasonal flights to international destinations.
  The airport is classified as a restricted international airport due to its short runway and serves only domestic flights.

Chhattisgarh

Goa

Gujarat

Haryana

 The airport is geographically located in both Chandigarh & Mohali while it serves Chandigarh, Mohali (Punjab) & Panchkula (Haryana)

Himachal Pradesh

Jharkhand

Karnataka

Kerala

Madhya Pradesh 

  The airport is designated as domestic but has operated special flights to Jeddah during Hajj.

Maharashtra

  MIAL is a consortium of Adani Group, ACSA and AAI
  Government of Maharashtra has approved renaming the airport as Chhatrapati Sambhaji Maharaj Airport and has sent the proposal to Ministry of Civil Aviation

Manipur

  The airport is classified as international but serves only domestic flights.

Meghalaya

Mizoram

Nagaland

Odisha

Punjab

 The airport is geographically located in both Chandigarh & Mohali while it serves Chandigarh, Mohali (Punjab) & Panchkula (Haryana)

Rajasthan

Sikkim

Tamil Nadu

Telangana

Tripura

Uttar Pradesh

  LIAL (Lucknow International Airport Limited) is a consortium of Adani Group and AAI.

Uttarakhand

West Bengal

  The airport has limited international operations.

Airports by union territory

Andaman and Nicobar Islands

  IAF operates few flights from these islands to Port Blair

Chandigarh

 The airport is geographically located in both Chandigarh & Mohali while it serves Chandigarh, Mohali (Punjab) & Panchkula (Haryana)

Dadra and Nagar Haveli and Daman and Diu

Delhi

  Currently the airport is not used for commercial purposes, but rather used for some VIP flights

Jammu and Kashmir

  The airport is classified as an international airport as only seasonal flights operate to Medina and Sharjah

Ladakh

Names shown in bold indicate the airport has scheduled service on commercial airlines.

Lakshadweep

Puducherry

See also
List of the busiest airports in India
Airports Authority of India
List of pilot training institutes in India

References

Sources

 
 
 
 
 
 IATA and ICAO codes at gcmap.com
 List of Indian Air Force Stations at globalsecurity.org
 List of Indian Airfields at pilotfriend.com

External links 
 Official Website - Airports Authority of India's
 Official Website - Directorate General of Civil Aviation
 Official Website - Ministry of Civil Aviation

 
 
India